Óscar Cristi Gallo (June 29, 1916 – March 25, 1965) was a Chilean police officer and a successful show jumping rider from the late 1940s until the late 1960s.

In 1952 he won both individual and team Olympic silver medals. He was the first Chilean athlete to win two Olympic medals. The Chilean team jumping in 1952 was Óscar Cristi on Bambi, César Mendoza on Pillán and Ricardo Echeverría on Lindo Peal. 

On March 25, 1965, he had a fatal car accident as he was about to retire from the post of Deputy Director-General of the Carabineros. In 1992 the riding school in Santiago operated by the Carabineros was renamed in his honor.

References

1916 births
1965 deaths
Chilean police officers
Olympic silver medalists for Chile
Olympic equestrians of Chile
Chilean male equestrians
Equestrians at the 1952 Summer Olympics
Show jumping riders
Sportspeople from Santiago
Olympic medalists in equestrian
Medalists at the 1952 Summer Olympics
Pan American Games bronze medalists for Chile
Pan American Games medalists in equestrian
Equestrians at the 1955 Pan American Games
Competitors at the 1959 Pan American Games
Road incident deaths in Chile
Medalists at the 1955 Pan American Games
Medalists at the 1959 Pan American Games
20th-century Chilean people